Leon Hermant (1866–1936) was a French-American sculptor best known for his architectural sculpture.

Hermant was born in France, educated in Europe and came to America in 1904 to work on the French Pavilion at the Louisiana Purchase Exposition in St. Louis, Missouri.  For most of his career he was based in Chicago, working mostly in the American midwest, and frequently with a partner Carl Beil.

In 1928 Hermant was awarded the Légion d'honneur by the French government for his Louis Pasteur Monument in Grant Park, Chicago.

Public monuments

Confederate Monument (1908) Parkersburg, West Virginia
William Shakespeare, (1915) Northwestern University, Evanston, Illinois
Louis Pasteur Monument, (1928) Grant Park, Chicago
Heroes of Illinois Memorial (1928) Memphis National Cemetery, Memphis, Tennessee
Governor Edward Coles Memorial, (1929) Valley View Cemetery, Edwardsville, Illinois
George Rogers Clark, (1932), Fort Massac,  Metropolis, Illinois
Polar Bear Memorial (1930) White Chapel Cemetery, Troy, Michigan
General John A. Logan Monument, Murphysboro, Illinois

Architectural sculpture
Cathedral of St. Paul (1905), St. Paul, Minnesota,  Emmanuel Louis Masqueray architect
Illinois Athletic Club Building, (1908), Chicago
Cook County Building, (1911), Chicago
University High School, (1918), Urbana, Illinois  Holabird & Roche architects
Benjamin Franklin Bridge, (1926) Philadelphia, Paul Cret, architect
Detroit Institute of Art  (1927),  Paul Cret et al. architect, Detroit
Radisson Chicago Hotel Reliefs, (1929), Chicago
One N La Salle Street (1930), Vitzthum & Burns architects,  Chicago
carvings at the Indiana State Library and Historical Building, (1934) Indianapolis
Four Modes of Travel, Calvert Street Bridge, now Duke Ellington Bridge, (1935) Washington D.C.
United States Customs Building, (1936) Washington, D.C.   WPA
United States Interstate Commerce Commission Building, (1936) Washington D.C.

References

Bach, Ira and Mary Lackritz Gray, Chicago's Public Sculpture, University of Chicago Press, Chicago, 1983
Falk, Peter Hastings, Editor Who Was Who in American Art, Sound View Press, Madison Connecticut, 1985
Kvaran and Lockley, A Guide to Architectural Sculpture in America
Riedy, James L., Chicago Sculpture, University of Illinois Press, Urbana, Illinois 1981
Rooney, William A., Architectural Ornamentation in Chicago, Chicago Review Press, Chicago, 1984
Scheinman, Muriel, A Guide to the Art at the University of Illinois: Urbana-Champaign, Robert Allerton Park and Chicago, University of Illinois Press, Urbana, 1995

External links
 

American architectural sculptors
1866 births
1936 deaths
Artists from Chicago
Recipients of the Legion of Honour
French emigrants to the United States
19th-century American sculptors
19th-century American male artists
American male sculptors
20th-century American sculptors
20th-century American male artists
Sculptors from Illinois